= Kubihal =

Kubihal (ಕುಬಿಹಾಳ)
- Village
- Country: India
- State: Karnataka
- District: Dharwad

Government
  - Body: ಗಾಂಧಿ ಗ್ರಾಮ ಪುರಸ್ಕಾರGram panchayat

Population (2011)
  - Total: 3,683

Languages
  - Official: Kannada
- Time zone: UTC+5:30 (IST)
- ISO 3166 code: IN-KA
- Vehicle registration: KA 63
- Website: karnataka.gov.in

Kubihal is a village in Dharwad district of Karnataka, India.

== Demographics ==
As of the 2011 Census of India there were 657 households in Kubihal and a total population of 3,683 consisting of 1,915 males and 1,768 females. There were 456 children ages 0-6.
